Highway 41 (41 ) starts at intersection with Route 4 in Chumphon Province. It goes southward passing through Surat Thani Province and Nakhon Si Thammarat Province. It ends at Phatthalung Province joining Route 4 again.

Route Details
Route 41 is the main road for lower southern provinces. It starts at Pathomporn Intersection. At this intersection, Route 4 changes direction to the west coast of southern part. Route 41 goes directly southward which is shorter for most southern provinces.

In Chumphon Province, it starts at Amphoe Mueang Chumphon and passes through  Amphoe Sawi, Amphoe Thung Tako, Amphoe Lang Suan and Amphoe Lamae. It enters Surat Thani Province at Amphoe Tha Chana and passes through Amphoe Chaiya, Amphoe Tha Chang, Amphoe Phunphin, Amphoe Ban Na Doem, Amphoe Ban Na San and Amphoe Wiang Sa. It then enters Nakhon Si Thammarat Province at Amphoe Chawang, and continues through Amphoe Na Bon, Amphoe Thung Song, Amphoe Ron Phibun, Amphoe Chulabhorn and Amphoe Cha-uat. It enters Phatthalung Province at Amphoe Pa Phayom, and passes through Amphoe Khuan Khanun. It ends at Amphoe Mueang Phatthalung.

Total length is about 390 km. About 110 km is in Chumphon Province, 140 km in Surat Thani Province, 105 km in Nakhon Si Thammarat Province and 35 km in Phatthalung Province. Route 41 is 4 lane, 2 lane for each direction with ditch to separate direction.

Route 41 is also Asian Highway AH2

List of Intersection

Chumphon Province
(Start) Route 4 (westward to Ranong Province), Route 4001 (eastward to Amphoe Mueang Chumphon)
Route 4006 (westward to Ranong Province)
Surat Thani Province
Route 4011 (eastward to Amphoe Chaiya)
Route 417 (eastward to Amphoe Mueang Surat Thani)
Route 4153 (eastward to Amphoe Phunphin, Amphoe Mueang Surat Thani)
Route 401 (westward to Phang Nga Province, Phuket, eastward to Amphoe Mueang Surat Thani, Nakhon Si Thammarat Province)
Route 44 (westward to Phang Nga Province, Krabi Province, eastward to Nakhon Si Tammarat Province)
Nakhon Si Thammarat Province
Route 403 #1 (northward to Amphoe Thung Song, southward to Trang Province)
Route 403 #2 (northward to Amphoe Mueang Nakhon Si Thammarat)
Phatthalung Province
(End) Route 4 and Route 4047 (westward to Trang Province, southward to Songkhla Province, eastward to Amphoe Mueang Phatthalung)

References

National highways in Thailand